Carlo "Charlie" Villani (born 2 March 1963) is an Australian former soccer player who played as a forward.

Club career
Villani began his senior career at Adelaide City in the National Soccer League where he played between 1984 and 1989. After state league stints in Canberra and Melbourne he returned to the NSL with Morwell Falcons in 1994, playing three seasons for the Gippsland club.

International career
Villani played one full international match in 1987 for Australia when he came on as an 83rd-minute substitute against Morocco in Gangneung.

He also played four matches with the Socceroo B team.

Coaching career
In 2002 Villani coached Adelaide City in the National Soccer League before resigning mid-season after a poor run of results.

On 22 October 2009, he was appointed as coach of the Adelaide City who are now in the South Australian Super League.

References

Living people
1963 births
Australian soccer players
Association football forwards
Australia international soccer players
Para Hills Knights players
Adelaide City FC players
Gippsland Falcons players